The canton of Villiers-sur-Marne is an administrative division of the Val-de-Marne department, Île-de-France region, northern France. Its borders were modified at the French canton reorganisation which came into effect in March 2015. Its seat is in Villiers-sur-Marne.

It consists of the following communes:
Bry-sur-Marne
Le Plessis-Trévise
Villiers-sur-Marne

References

Cantons of Val-de-Marne